Frederick Otto  Wunderlich (28 June 1861 – 12 May 1951), known as Otto, along with his two brothers, Alfred and Ernest created the well known Wunderlich brand of building products in early 20th century Australia, based in Sydney.

Wunderlich was best known as a manufacturer of pressed metal, used to create decorative domestic and commercial ceilings and dados, and of the red ‘Marseilles’ patterned roof tile, a ubiquitous and defining characteristic of the Federation house. The company also manufactured Faience, and asbestos cement pipes, as well as roof tiles and wall sheets, inexpensive and popular material for houses in Australia from the 1920s into the 1950s.

Like his brothers, Otto was born in Islington, London, to German born parents, and was educated in London, Germany and Switzerland. He studied medicine in Lucerne and London, where he practiced as a doctor in the 1890s. In 1900, he moved to Australia to join his brothers, where he reorganised the company on more efficient lines, and introduced a range of benefits for their employees, creating a loyal workforce.

See also

 Octavius Charles Beale
 William Henry Paling
 William Baillieu
 Theodore Fink
 George Percy Grainger
 Henri Adrien Marie Verbrugghen
 Joseph Bradley
 William Arundel Orchard
 George Rayner Hoff
 Sir John Frederick Neville Cardus
 Sir William Dobell

References

Australian businesspeople
Australian people of German descent
1861 births
1951 deaths
People from Islington (district)
English emigrants to Australia